General Cavendish may refer to:

Alfred Cavendish (1859–1943), British Army brigadier general
Charles Cavendish (general) (1620–1643), English royalist colonel-general
Charles Cavendish (Nottingham MP) (1591–1653), English royalist lieutenant general
Charles Cavendish, 3rd Baron Chesham (1850–1907), British Army brigadier general and temporary major general
Lord Frederick Cavendish (British Army officer) (1729–1803), British Army general
Henry Cavendish (British Army officer) (1789–1873), British Army general